Donna Independent School District is a public school district based in Donna, Texas (USA).

In addition to Donna, the district also serves Scissors and South Alamo; and portions of Alamo, Midway North, and Midway South.

In 2010, Donna ISD was rated "academically acceptable" by the Texas Education Agency.  Donna ISD's total student enrollment for 2010 was 14,873 according to the Texas Education Agency's website.  Donna ISD's current superintendent is Roberto Loredo since 2007.

The Texas Education Agency's college readiness performance data shows that only 2% (13 out of 656 students) of the graduates of the class of 2010 of the Donna school district met TEA's average performance criterion on SAT or ACT college admission tests.

Recent history

On January 24, 2011, a federal judge in McAllen, Texas sentenced the former president of the board of trustees of Donna ISD, George Hernandez, to five months in prison, five months of house arrest, three years of probation, and a $3,000 fine for paying thousands of dollars in kickbacks to curry favors from the PSJA school board. Mr. Hernandez had previously pleaded guilty to the criminal charges.

On November 13, 2009, a federal jury awarded $1.2 million to a former superintendent of Donna ISD who was illegally terminated in 2001.  Plaintiff's attorney Kevin O'Hanlon described the jury verdict as a message to school districts across Texas to abide by the law and not play politics.  Donna ISD's lawyer Eileen Leeds had described the former superintendent's lawsuit as motivated by greed.  The federal jury also awarded damages against Donna ISD's former attorneys –  lawyer Gustavo Acevedo and Jaime Munoz each to pay $87,750 to plaintiff Andres Martinez for violating his constitutional rights of due process. Both Acevedo and Munoz filed an appeal with the 5th Circuit Court of Appeals (case no. 10-40352) which was dismissed by the appeals court on May 24, 2010.

In April 2006, the chief financial officer of Donna ISD filed complaints with FBI-McAllen, Texas Education Agency, and Department of Justice regarding widespread corruption, extortion, bribery, theft, and abuse of taxpayer money at Donna ISD.  All agencies found his comments were not substantiated with factual data and his motivation was due to his upcoming termination.  The Texas Education Agency investigated the complaints and issued its final investigative report in 2007.  TEA found the CFO had incorrectly used federal funds. As a result of TEA's report, Donna ISD supt., Joe D. Gonzalez moved to terminate the CFO and worked with TEA to rectify the situation.

There were no findings against any school district employees.  TEA praised supt., Joe D. Gonzalez, for his quick action and integrity to the Texas school financial system.

Schools

High schools (Grades 9-12)
Donna High School
Donna North High School

Middle schools (Grades 6-8)
A.P. Solis Middle School
D.M. Sauceda Middle School
Veterans Middle School
W.A. Todd Middle School

Elementary schools (Grades PK-5)
A.M. Ochoa Elementary School
B.G. Guzman Elementary School
Captain D. Salinas Elementary School
C. Stainke Elementary School
D. Singleterry Elementary School
E.G. Salazar Elementary School
J.S. Adame Elementary School
J.W. Caceres Elementary School
M.A.P. Munoz Elementary School
M. Rivas Elementary School
P.S. Garza Elementary School
Runn Elementary School
Truman Price Elementary School

Additional schools
3D Academy
Disciplinary Alternative Education Program
Excel Academy

References

External links

 

School districts in Hidalgo County, Texas